The 2006 Maryland House of Delegates elections were held on November 7, 2006, as part of the 2006 United States elections, including the 2006 Maryland gubernatorial election . All 141 of Maryland's state delegates were up for reelection. Democrats gained eight seats in the House of Delegates, retaining supermajority control of the chamber.

Election results

District 1A
This district represents Allegany and Garrett counties.
Voters to choose one:
{| class="wikitable"
|-
!Name
!Votes
!Percent
!Outcome
|-
|-
|Wendell R. Beitzel, Rep.
|6,985
|  56.3%
|   Won
|-
|-
|Bill Aiken, Dem.
|5,406
|  43.5%
|   Lost
|}

District 1B
This district represents a portion of Allegany County.
Voters to choose one:
{| class="wikitable"
|-
!Name
!Votes
!Percent
!Outcome
|-
|-
|Kevin Kelly Dem.
|6,489
|  55.7%
|   Won
|-
|-
|Mark A. Fisher, Rep.
|5,151
|  44.2%
|   Lost
|}

District 1C
This district represents portions of Allegany and Washington counties.
Voters to choose one:
{| class="wikitable"
|-
!Name
!Votes
!Percent
!Outcome
|-
|-
|LeRoy E. Myers Jr., Rep.
|6,398
|  57.2%
|   Won
|-
|-
|Brian Grim, Dem.
|4,769
|  42.7%
|   Lost
|}

District 2A
This district represents a portion of Washington County.
Voters to choose one:
{| class="wikitable"
|-
!Name
!Votes
!Percent
!Outcome
|-
|-
|Robert A. McKee, Rep.
|11,676
|  99.2%
|   Won
|-
|-
|Other write-ins
|94
|  0.8%
|   Lost
|}

District 2B
This district represents a portion of Washington County.
Voters to choose one:
{| class="wikitable"
|-
!Name
!Votes
!Percent
!Outcome
|-
|-
|Christopher B. Shank, Rep.
|9,606
|  99%
|   Won
|-
|-
|Other write-ins
|101
|  1.0%
|   Lost
|}

District 2C
This district represents a portion of Washington County.
Voters to choose one:
{| class="wikitable"
|-
!Name
!Votes
!Percent
!Outcome
|-
|-
|John P. Donoghue Dem.
|5,099
|  55.5%
|   Won
|-
|-
|Paul Muldowney, Rep.
|4,078
|  44.4%
|   Lost
|}

District 3A
This district represents a portion of Frederick County.
Voters to choose two:
{| class="wikitable"
|-
!Name
!Votes
!Percent
!Outcome
|-
|-
|Sue Hecht Dem.
|13,900
|  28.7%
|   Won
|-
|-
|Galen R. Clagett Dem.
|12,422
|  25.7%%
|   Won
|-
|-
|Patrick N. Hogan, Rep.
|12,163
|  25.1%%
|   Lost
|-
|-
|Linda Naylor, Rep.
|9,873
|  20.4%%%
|   Lost
|}

District 3B
This district represents portions of Frederick and Washington counties.
Voters to choose one:
{| class="wikitable"
|-
!Name
!Votes
!Percent
!Outcome
|-
|-
|Richard B. Weldon Jr., Rep.
|10,057
|  61.4%
|   Won
|-
|-
|-
|Paul Gilligan, Dem.
|6,317
|  38.6%
|   Lost
|}

District 4A
This district represents a portion of Frederick County.

Voters to choose two:
{| class="wikitable"
|-
!Name
!Votes
!Percent
!Outcome
|-
|-
|Joseph R. Bartlett, Rep.
|16,545
|  36.8%
|   Won
|-
|-
|-
|Paul S. Stull, Rep
|17,765
|  39.5%
|   Won
|-
|-
|Maggi Margaret Hays, Dem
|10,519
|  23.4%
|   Lost
|-
|Other write-ins
|140
|  0.3%
|   Lost
|}

District 4B
This district represents portions of Carroll and Frederick counties.
Voters to choose one:
{| class="wikitable"
|-
!Name
!Votes
!Percent
!Outcome
|-
|-
|Donald B. Elliott, Rep.
|10,148
|  69.8%
|   Won
|-
|-
|-
|Timothy Schlauch, Dem.
|4,374
|  30.1%
|   Lost
|-
|Other write-ins
|12
|  0.1%
|   Lost
|}

District 5A
This district represents a portion of Carroll county.
Voters to choose two:
{| class="wikitable"
|-
!Name
!Votes
!Percent
!Outcome
|-
|-
|Tanya Thornton Shewell, Rep.
|18,785
|  32.9%
|   Won
|-
|-
|Nancy R. Stocksdale, Rep.
|20,630
|  36.1%
|   Won
|-
|-
|Ann Darrin, Dem.
|9,489
|  16.6%
|   Lost
|-
|-
|Frank Henry Rammes, Dem.
|8,192
|  14.3%
|   Lost
|-
|Other write-ins
|57
|  0.1%
|   Lost
|}

District 5B
This district represents a portion of Baltimore County.
Voters to choose two:
{| class="wikitable"
|-
!Name
!Votes
!Percent
!Outcome
|-
|-
|Wade Kach, Rep.
|15,321
|  98.9%
|   Won
|-
|Other write-ins
|172
|  1.1%
|   Lost
|}

District 6
This district represents a portion of Baltimore County.
Voters to choose three:
{| class="wikitable"
|-
!Name
!Votes
!Percent
!Outcome
|-
|-
|John A. Olszewski Jr., Democratic
|18,769
|  22.9%
|   Won
|-
|-
|Joseph J. Minnick, Democratic
|17,379
|  21.2%
|   Won
|-
|-
|Michael H. Weir Jr., Democratic
|17,117
|  20.9%
|   Won
|-
|-
|Steve Dishon, Republican
|   10,961
|   13.4
|   Lost
|-
|-
| Richard W. Metzgar, Republican
|   8,915
|   10.9%
|   Lost
|-
|-
|Paul M. Blitz, Republican
|  8,765
|  10.7%
|   Lost
|-
|-
|John Scott, Unaffiliated
|  106
|  0.1%
|   Lost
|}

District 7
Northern Baltimore County.
Voters to choose three:
{| class="wikitable"
|-
!Name
!Votes
!Percent
!Outcome
|-
|-
|Richard Impallaria, Rep.
|21,333
|  18.7%
|   Won
|-
|-
|J. B. Jennings, Rep.
|21,189
|  18.6%
|   Won
|-
|-
|Pat McDonough, Rep.
|23,184
|  20.3%
|   Won
|-
|-
|Linda W. Hart, Dem.
|17,122
|  20.3%
|   Lost
|-
|-
|Jack Sturgill, Dem.
|15,390
|  15.0%
|   Lost
|-
|-
|Rebecca L. Nelson, Dem.
|13,481
|  11.8%
|   Lost
|-
|-
|Kim Fell, Green
|2,307
|  2.0%
|   Lost
|-
|Other write-ins
|83
|  0.1%
|   Lost
|}

District 8
This district represents a portion of Baltimore County.

Voters to choose three:
{| class="wikitable"
|-
!Name
!Votes
!Percent
!Outcome
|-
|-
|Joseph C. Boteler III, Rep.
|19,586
|  17.4%
|   Won
|-
|-
|Eric M. Bromwell
|20,116
|  17.9%
|   Won
|-
|-
|Todd Schuler
|18,356
|  16.3%
|   Won
|-
|-
|John Cluster
|18,057
|  16.0%
|   Lost
|-
|-
|Melissa Redmer Mullahey
|18,160
|  16.1%
|   Lost
|-
|-
|Ruth Baisden
|18,261
|  16.2%
|   Lost
|-
|Other write-ins
|74
|  0.1%
|   Lost
|-
|}

District 9A
Howard County

Voters to choose three:

{| class="wikitable"
|-
!Name
!Votes
!Percent
!Outcome
|-
|-
|Gail Bates, Rep.
|22,862
|  39.6%
|   Won
|-
|-
|Warren E. Miller, Rep.
|18,533
|  32.1%
|   Won
|-
|-
|David Leonard Osmundson
|16,162
|  28.0%
|   Lost
|-
|Other write-ins
|123
|  0.2%
|   Lost
|-
|}

District 9B
This district represents a portion of Carroll County.

Voters to choose three:
{| class="wikitable"
|-
!Name
!Votes
!Percent
!Outcome
|-
|-
|Susan Krebs, Rep.
|12,059
|  72.1%
|   Won
|-
|-
|Anita Lombardi Riley, Dem.
|4,621
|  27.6%
|   Lost
|-
|Other write-ins
|38
|  0.2%
|   Lost
|-
|}

District 10
This district represents a portion of Baltimore County.
Voters to choose three:
{| class="wikitable"
|-
!Name
!Votes
!Percent
!Outcome
|-
|-
|Emmett C. Burns Jr.
|29,140
|  34.2%
|   Won
|-
|-
|Shirley Nathan-Pulliam
|28,544
|  33.5%
|   Won
|-
|-
|Adrienne A. Jones
|27,064
|  31.8%
|   Won
|-
|Other write-ins
|370
|  0.4%
|   
|-
|}

District 11 (House)
This western Baltimore County district includes Owings Mills and Reisterstown.

Democrats
Jon S. Cardin, incumbent (1st term); nephew of U.S. Senator Ben Cardin (winner)
Dan K. Morhaim, incumbent (winner)
Julian E. Jones, (lost primary)
Dana Stein (winner)
Republicans
Patrick Abbondandolo
Patrick V. Dyer
Greens
David Goldsmith

District 12A
West Baltimore County and northeast Howard County district

Democrats
Steven J. DeBoy Sr., incumbent (1 term) (winner)
James E. Malone Jr., incumbent (3 terms) (winner)
Republicans
Joe Hooe
Albert L. Nalley

District 12B
This is a Howard County district.

Democrat
Elizabeth Bobo, incumbent (winner)

Republican
Christopher J. Feldwick

District 13 (House)
Voters to choose three:

{| class="wikitable"
|-
!Name
!Votes
!Percent
!Outcome
|-
|- 
|Guy Guzzone, Democratic
|26,891
|  22.3%
|   Won
|-
|- 
|Shane E. Pendergrass, Democratic
|26,633
|  22.1%
|   Won
|-
|- 
|Frank S. Turner, Democratic
|24,437
|  20.3%
|   Won
|-
|- 
|Mary Beth Tung, Republican
|15,216
|  12.6%
|   Lost
|-
|- 
|Rick Bowers, Republican
|13,665
|  11.4%
|   Lost
|-
|- 
|Loretta Gaffney, Republican
|13,466
|  11.2%
|   Lost
|-
|- 
|other write-ins
|84
|  0.1%
|   Lost
|-
|}

Montgomery County

District 14

Voters to choose three:
{| class="wikitable"
|-
!Name
!Votes
!Percent
!Outcome
|-
|- 
|Anne Kaiser, Democratic
|24,500
|  21.8%
|   Won
|-
|- 
|Karen S. Montgomery, Democratic
|24,478
|  21.8%
|   Won
|-
|- 
|Herman L. Taylor Jr., Democratic
|24,273
|  21.6%
|   Won
|-
|- 
|John McKinnis, Republican
|13,471
|  12.0%
|   Lost
|-
|- 
|John Austin, Republican
|12,963
|  11.5%
|   Lost
|-
|- 
|Jim Goldberg, Republican
|12,603
|  11.2%
|   Lost
|-
|- 
|Other write-ins
|61
|  0.1%
|   Lost
|-
|}

District 15
Voters to choose three:
{| class="wikitable"
|-
!Name
!Votes
!Percent
!Outcome
|-
|-
|Kathleen M. Dumais, Dem.
|25,781
|  21.6%
|   Won
|-
|-
|Brian J. Feldman, Dem.
|25,760
|  21.6%
|   Won
|-
|-
|Craig L. Rice, Dem.
|20,202
|  17.0%
|   Won
|-
|-
|Jean B. Cryor, Rep.
|20,050
|  16.8%
|   Lost
|-
|-
|Brian Mezger, Rep.
|14,112
|  11.8%
|   Lost
|-
|-
|Chris Pilkerton, Rep.
|13,174
|  11.1%
|   Lost
|-
|}

District 16
Democrats
William A. Bronrott (winner)
Marilyn R. Goldwater (winner)
Susan C. Lee (winner)
Republicans

District 17
Democrats
Kumar P. Barve (winner)
James W. Gilchrist (winner)
Luiz R. S. Simmons (winner)
Republicans

District 18
Democrats
Ana Sol Gutierrez (winner)
Jane Lawton (winner)
Jeff Waldstreicher (winner)
Greens
John Low
Republicans

District 20 (House)
Former Del. Peter Franchot ran and won the race for state Comptroller.

Democrats
 Gareth Murray, incumbent (1st term)
 Sheila Hixson, incumbent (7th term) (winner)
 Tom Hucker (winner)
 Aaron Klein
 Heather Mizeur (winner)
Republicans

Prince George's County

District 21 (House)
Former Del. Pauline Menes retired

Democrats
Mark Cook
Jon Black
Barbara A. Frush, incumbent (3rd term) (winner)
Brian R. Moe, incumbent (2nd term)
Ben Barnes (winner)
Joseline Pena-Melnyk (winner)
Tekisha Everette
Michael Sarich
Republicans
Neil B. Sood

District 22
Democrats
Tawanna P. Gaines (winner)
Anne Healey (winner)
Justin D. Ross (winner)
Republicans

District 23A
Democrats
James W. Hubbard (winner)
Gerron Levi (winner)
Republicans

District 23B
Democrats
Marvin E. Holmes Jr. (winner)
Republicans

District 24
Prince George's County

Democrats
Joanne C. Benson (winner)
Carolyn J. B. Howard (winner)
Michael L. Vaughn (winner)
Republicans

District 25
Democrats
Aisha N. Braveboy (winner)
Dereck E. Davis (winner)
Melony G. Griffith, incumbent (winner)
Republicans
Greens
David Kiasi

District 26
Democrats
Veronica L. Turner, incumbent (winner)
Kris Valderrama (winner)
Jay Walker (winner)
Republicans

District 27A
Voters to choose two:
{| class="wikitable"
|-
!Name
!Votes
!Percent
!Outcome
|-
|- 
|James E. Proctor Jr., Democratic
|19,829
|  40.3%
|   Won
|-
|- 
|Joseph F. Vallario Jr., Democratic
|18,677
|  38.0%
|   Won
|-
|- 
|Kenneth S. Brown, Democratic
|5,687
|  11.6%
|   Lost
|-
|- 
|Antoinette Jarboe-Duley, Democratic
|4,948
|  10.1%
|   Lost
|-
|-
|Other write-ins
|48
|  .1%
|   
|-
|}

District 47
Prince George's County

Voters to choose three:
{| class="wikitable"
|-
!Name
!Votes
!Percent
!Outcome
|-
|- 
|Jolene Ivey, Democratic
|12,860
|  35.5%
|   Won
|-
|- 
|Victor R. Ramirez, Democratic
|12,231
|  33.6%
|   Won
|-
|- 
|Doyle L. Niemann, Democratic
|11,229
|  30.8%
|   Won
|-
|-
|Other write-ins
|120
|  .3%
|   
|-
|}

District 27B
Democrats
Sue Kullen (winner)
Republicans

District 28
Democrats
Sally Y. Jameson, incumbent (winner)
Murray D. Levy (winner)
Peter Murphy (politician) (winner)
Republicans

District 29A
Charles & St. Mary's counties
Democrats
John F. Wood Jr. (winner)
Republicans

District 29B
St. Mary's County
Democrats
John L. Bohanan Jr. (winner)

District 29C
Calvert & St. Mary's counties
Voters to choose one:
{| class="wikitable"
|-
!Name
!Votes
!Percent
!Outcome
|-
|-
|Anthony J. O'Donnell, Rep.
|7,739
|  60.3%
|   Won
|-
|-
|Norma Powers, Dem.
|18,533
|  39.6%
|   Lost
|-
|Other write-ins
|11
|  0.1%
|   Lost
|-
|}

District 30
Voters to choose three:
{| class="wikitable"
|-
!Name
!Votes
!Percent
!Outcome
|-
|-
|Michael E. Busch, Dem.
|22,479
|  17.1%
|   Won
|-
|-
|Virginia P. Clagett, Dem.
|22,360
|  17.0%
|   Won
|-
|-
|Ronald A. George, Rep.
|21,811
|  16.6%
|   Won
|-
|-
|Barbara Samorajczyk, Dem.
|21,758
|  16.5%
|   Lost
|-
|-
|Andy Smarick, Rep.
|20,594
|  15.6%
|   Lost
|-
|-
|Ron Elfenbein, Rep.
|20,457
|  15.5%
|   Lost
|-
|-
|David Whitney, Constitution
|2,225
|  1.7%
|   Lost
|-
|Other write-ins
|80
|  0.1%
|   
|-
|}

District 31
Former Del. John R. Leopold (R) ran and won the Anne Arundel County Executive race

Voters to choose three:
{| class="wikitable"
|-
!Name
!Votes
!Percent
!Outcome
|-
|-
|Steve Schuh, Rep.
|19,049
|  18.4%
|   Won
|-
|-
|Nicholaus R. Kipke, Rep.
|18,150
|  17.5%
|   Won
|-
|-
|Don H. Dwyer Jr., Rep.
|17,558
|  17.0%
|   Won
|-
|-
|Joan Cadden, Dem.
|17,533
|  16.9%
|   Lost
|-
|-
|Thomas J. Fleckenstein, Dem.
|16,654
|  16.1%
|   Lost
|-
|-
|Craig A. Reynolds, Dem.
|14,454
|  14.0%
|   Lost
|-
|Other write-ins
|58
|  0.1%
|   
|-
|}

District 32 (House)
Voters to choose three:
{| class="wikitable"
|-
!Name
!Votes
!Percent
!Outcome
|-
|-
|Mary Ann Love, Dem.
|15,823
|  19%
|   Won
|-
|-
|Theodore J. Sophocleus, Dem.
|15,382
|  18%
|   Won
|-
|-
|Pamel Beidle, Rep.
|
|  
|   Won
|-
|-
|
|
|  
|   Lost
|-
|-
|
|
|  
|   Lost
|-
|-
|
|
|  
|   Lost
|-
|}

District 33A
Former Del. David G. Boschert ran for Anne Arundel County Executive on the Republican ticket and lost the primary.

Voters to choose two:
{| class="wikitable"
|-
!Name
!Votes
!Percent
!Outcome
|-
|-
|James King Rep.
|18,542
|  29.0%
|   Won
|-
|-
|Tony McConkey, Rep.
|16,655
|  26.0%
|   Won
|-
|-
|Patricia Weathersbee, Dem.
|15,226
|  23.8%
|   Lost
|-
|-
|Paul G. Rudolph, Dem.
|13,461
|  21.0%
|   Lost
|-
|Other write-ins
|73
|  0.1%
|   
|-
|}

District 33B
Voters to choose one:
{| class="wikitable"
|-
!Name
!Votes
!Percent
!Outcome
|-
|-
|Robert A. Costa, Rep.
|10,484
|  58.1%
|   Won
|-
|-
|Mike Shay, Dem.
|7,568
|  41.9%
|   Lost
|-
|Other write-ins
|7
|  0.0%
|   
|-
|}

District 34A
Voters to choose two:

{| class="wikitable"
!Name
!Votes
!Percent
!Outcome
|-
|-
|Mary Dulany James, Dem.
|12,697
|  31.7%
|   Won
|-
|-
|B. Daniel Riley, Dem.
|10,969
|  27.3%
|   Won
|-
|-
|Glen Glass, Rep.
|8,554
|  21.0%
|   Lost
|-
|-
|Sheryl Davis Kohl, Rep.
|8,085
|  19.9%
|   Lost
|-
|Write-In's
|22
|  0.1%
|   Lost
|}

District 34B
Cecil County
Voters to choose one:
{| class="wikitable"
|-
!Name
!Votes
!Percent
!Outcome
|-
|-
|Susan K. McComas, Rep.
|10,922
|  62.5%
|   Won
|-
|-
|David Carey, Dem.
|6,536
|  37.4%
|   Lost
|-
|Other write-ins
|9
|  0.1%
|   
|-
|}

District 35A
Voters to choose two:
{| class="wikitable"
|-
!Name
!Votes
!Percent
!Outcome
|-
|-
|Barry Glassman, Rep.
|21,766
|  40.1%
|   Won
|-
|-
|Donna Stifler, Rep.
|18,909
|  34.8%
|   Won
|-
|-
|Craig H. DeRan, Dem.
|13,589
|  25.0%
|   Lost
|-
|Other write-ins
|81
|  0.1%
|   
|-
|}

District 35B
Voters to choose one:
{| class="wikitable"
|-
!Name
!Votes
!Percent
!Outcome
|-
|-
|Susan K. McComas, Rep.
|10,922
|  62.5%
|   Won
|-
|-
|David Carey, Dem.
|6,536
|  37.4%
|   Lost
|-
|Other write-ins
|9
|  0.1%
|   
|-
|}

District 36
Voters to choose one per county:
{| class="wikitable"
!Name
!Votes
!Percent
!Outcome
|-
|-
|Michael D. Smigiel Sr., Rep.
|17,764
|  53.4%
|   Won
|-
|-
|Mark Guns, Dem.
|15,475
|  46.6%
|   Lost
|-
|}
Voters to choose one per county:
{| class="wikitable"
!Name
!Votes
!Percent
!Outcome
|-
|-
|Mary Roe Walkup, Rep.
|19,430
|  59.0%
|   Won
|-
|-
|Joan O. Horsey, Dem.
|13,498
|  41.0%
|   Won
|}
Voters to choose one per county:
{| class="wikitable"
!Name
!Votes
!Percent
!Outcome
|-
|-
|Richard A. Sossi, Rep.
|19,450
|  53.4%
|   Won
|-
|-
|Wheeler R. Baker, Dem.
|16,950
|  46.6%
|   Lost
|-
|}

District 37A
Democrats
Rudolph C. Cane, incumbent (winner)
Republicans

District 37B
Voters to choose two:
{| class="wikitable"
!Name
!Votes
!Percent
!Outcome
|-
|-
|Adelaide C. Eckardt, Rep.
|19,980
|  34.5%
|   Won
|-
|-
|Jeannie Haddaway, Rep.
|18,677
|  32.2%
|   Won
|-
|-
|James A. Adkins, Dem.
|9,640
|  16.6%
|   Lost
|-
|-
|Tim Quinn, Dem.
|9,588
|  16.6%
|   Lost
|-
|Other write-ins
|34
|  0.1%
|   Lost
|}

District 38A
Voters to choose one:
{| class="wikitable"
!Name
!Votes
!Percent
!Outcome
|-
|-
|D. Page Elmore, Rep.
|8,030
|  63.3%
|   Won
|-
|-
|Patrick M. Armstrong, Dem.
|4,652
|  36.6%
|   Lost
|-
|Other write-ins
|6
|  0.1%
|   Lost
|}

District 38B
Democrats
Norman Conway (winner)
James Mathias, appointed to fill seat of Bennett Bozman in summer 2006 (winner)
Republicans
Bonnie Luna
Michael James

District 39
Voters to choose three:
{| class="wikitable"
|-
!Name
!Votes
!Percent
!Outcome
|-
|-
|Nancy J. King, Democratic
|18,651
|  23.5%
|   Won
|-
|-
|Charles E. Barkley, Democratic
|18,253
|  23.0%
|   Won
|-
|-
|Saqib Ali, Democratic
|16,455
|  20.7%
|   Won
|-
|-
| David Nichols, Republican
|   9,278
|   11.7%
|   Lost
|-
|-
| Gary Scott, Republican
|   8,363
|   10.4%
|   Lost
|-
|-
|Bill Witham, Republican
|  8,244
|  10.4%
|   Lost
|}

District 42
(Towson, Timonium, Lutherville, Cockeysville, Rodgers Forge & Loch Raven)
Voters to choose three:
{| class="wikitable"
!Name
!Votes
!Percent
!Outcome
|-
|-
|Susan Aumann, Rep.
|22,054
|  18.3%
|   Won
|-
|-
|William J. Frank, Rep.
|20,522
|  17.0%
|   Won
|-
|-
|Stephen W. Lafferty, Dem.
|21,117
|  17.5%
|   Won
|-
|-
|Dilip Paliath, Rep.
|19,490
|  16.2%
|   Lost
|-
|-
|Tracy Miller, Dem.
|19,168
|  15.9%
|   Lost
|-
|-
|Andrew Belt, Dem.
|18,006
|  14.9%
|   Lost
|-
|Other write-ins
|88
|  0.1%
|   Lost
|}

Baltimore City

District 40
Voters to choose three:
{| class="wikitable"
|-
!Name
!Votes
!Percent
!Outcome
|-
|-
|Frank M. Conaway Jr. Dem.
|16,432
|  32.4%
|   Won
|-
|-
|Barbara A. Robinson, Dem.
|16,032
|  31.6%
|   Won
|-
|-
|Shawn Z. Tarrant, Dem.
|13,921
|  27.5%
|   Won
|-
|-
|Jan E. Danforth, Green
|4,135
|  8.2%
|   Lost
|-
|Other write-ins
|177
|  0.3%
|   
|-
|}

District 41
Democrats
Jill P. Carter (winner)
Nathaniel T. Oaks (winner)
Samuel I. Rosenberg (winner)
Republicans

District 43
Baltimore City
Voters to choose three:
{| class="wikitable"
|-
!Name
!Votes
!Percent
!Outcome
|-
|- 
|Curt Anderson, Democratic
|22,315
|  29.4%
|   Won
|-
|- 
|Maggie McIntosh, Democratic
|22,093
|  29.1%
|   Won
|-
|- 
|Ann Marie Doory, Democratic
|21,219
|  28.0%
|   Won
|-
|- 
|Armand F. Girard, Republican
|3,425
|  4.5%
|   Lost
|-
|- 
|David G.S. Greene, Green
|2,619
|  3.5%
|   Lost
|-
|- 
|Brandy Baker, Green
|2,267
|  3.0%
|   Lost
|-
|- 
|Richard J. Ochs, Green
|1,772
|  2.3%
|   Lost
|-
|}

District 44
Baltimore City
Voters to choose three:
{| class="wikitable"
|-
!Name
!Votes
!Percent
!Outcome
|-
|- 
|Melvin L. Stukes Democratic
|13,173
|  34.0%
|   Won
|-
|- 
|Ruth M. Kirk, Democratic
|12,894
|  33.3%
|   Won
|-
|- 
|Keith E. Haynes, Democratic
|12,565
|  32.4%
|   Won
|-
|Other write-ins
|129
|  0.3%
|   
|-
|}

District 45
Baltimore City
Voters to choose three:
{| class="wikitable"
|-
!Name
!Votes
!Percent
!Outcome
|-
|- 
|Cheryl Glenn, Democratic
|16,911
|  32.6%
|   Won
|-
|- 
|Hattie N. Harrison, Democratic
|16,804
|  31.0%
|   Won
|-
|- 
|Talmadge Branch, Democratic
|16,014
|  30.9%
|   Won
|-
|- 
|Ronald M. Owens-Bey, Populist
|2,727
|  5.3%
|   Lost
|-
|Other write-ins
|111
|  .2%
|   Lost
|-
|}

District 46
Baltimore City

Voters to choose three:
{| class="wikitable"
|-
!Name
!Votes
!Percent
!Outcome
|-
|-
|Peter A. Hammen, Dem.
|15,883
|  29.6%
|   Won
|-
|-
|Carolyn J. Krysiak, Dem.
|15, 856
|  29.6%
|   Won
|-
|-
|Brian K. McHale, Dem.
|13,921
|  29.0%
|   Won
|-
|-
|Peter Kimos, Rep.
|6,219
|  11.6%
|   Lost
|-
|Other write-ins
|154
|  0.3%
|   
|-
|}

District 47

References

House of Delegates
Maryland House
Maryland House of Delegates elections